Kim Won-il  (born 18 October 1986) is a South Korean footballer who plays as a defender for Gimpo Citizen in the K3 League.

Personal life
He was educated at Gimpo Elementary School, Tongjin Middle and High Schools, and Soongsil University. Kim is a veteran of the Republic of Korea Marine Corps

Football career 

Kim Won-Il was a starter for Pohang Steelers in the 2013 K League 1 season. He was an integral part as in the last match of the season, he scored the league-winning goal against Ulsan Hyundai in a goal-mouth scramble in injury time.

References

External links 

1986 births
Living people
South Korean footballers
Pohang Steelers players
Jeju United FC players
K League 1 players
Republic of Korea Marine Corps personnel
People from Gimpo
Association football central defenders
Sportspeople from Gyeonggi Province